Salvia cuatrecasana is a perennial shrub that is endemic to a few small areas in Colombia, growing at  elevation on roadsides, streamsides, and disturbed
areas.

The upper leaf is green with sparse hairs and distinctive veins. The inflorescence has short, dense, terminal racemes with a  purple corolla held in a dark purple and strongly veined calyx. The dense, short racemes, purple flowers, and the prominent veins on leaf and calyx make the plant easily recognizable.

Notes

cuatrecasana
Endemic flora of Colombia